Dmitri Yevgenyevich Zarva (born 15 June 1985) is a former Russian professional football player.

Club career
He played in the Russian Football National League for FC Tyumen in 2014.

Personal life
His father Yevgeni Zarva played in the Russian Premier League for FC Dynamo-Gazovik Tyumen.

External links
 
 

1985 births
People from Tyumen
Living people
Russian footballers
Association football forwards
FC Tyumen players
Sportspeople from Tyumen Oblast